Sebastes is a genus of marine ray-finned fish belonging to the subfamily Sebastinae part of the family Scorpaenidae, most of which have the common name of rockfish. A few are called ocean perch, sea perch or redfish instead. They are found in the Atlantic and Pacific Oceans.

Taxonomy
Sebastes was first described as a genus in 1829 by the French zoologist Georges Cuvier, the Dutch ichthyologist Pieter Bleeker designated Perca norvegica, which may have been originally described by the Norwegian zoologist Peter Ascanius in 1772, as the type species in 1876. The genus is the type genus of both the tribe Sebastini and the subfamily Sebastinae, although some authorities treat these as the subfamily Sebastinae and the family Sebastidae, separating the Sebastidae as a distinct family from the Scorpaenidae. but other authorities place it in the Perciformes in the suborder Scorpaenoidei.

Some authorities subdivide this large genus into subgenera as follows:

 Sebastes Cuvier, 1829
 S. fasciatus
 S. mentella
 S. norvegicus
 S. viviparus
 Acutomentum Eigenmann & Beeson, 1893   
 S. alutus
 S. baramenuke 
 S. brevispinis
  S. entomelas
 S. flammeus
 S. hopkinsi
 S. iracundus
 S. kiyomatsui
 S. macdonaldi
 S. minor 
 S. ovalis
 S. rufus
 S. scythropus
 S. wakiyai
 Allosebastes Hubbs, 1951
 S. cortezi
 S. diploproa
 S. emphaeus
 S. peduncularis
 S. proriger
 S. rufinanus 
 S. saxicola
 S. semicinctus
 S. sinensis
 S. variegatus
 S. varispinis 
 S. wilsoni
 S. zacentrus
 Auctospina Eigenmann & Beeson 1893    
 S. auriculatus
 S. dallii
 Emmelas Jordan & Evermann 1898
 S. glaucus 
 Eosebastes Jordan & Evermann, 1896
 S. aurora 
 S. crameri
 S. melanosema
 S. melanostomus
 Hatumeus Matsubara, 1943    
 S. owstoni
 Hispaniscus Jordan & Evermann, 1896 
 S. elongatus
 S. levis 
 S. rubrivinctus
 Mebarus Matsubara 1943   
 S. atrovirens
 S. cheni
 S. inermis
 S. joyneri
 S. taczanowskii 
 S. thompsoni
 S. ventricosus 
 Murasoius Matsubara 1943    
 S. nudus
 S. pachycephalus
 Neohispaniscus Matsubara 1943
 S. schlegelii
 S. vulpes 
 S. zonatus
 Pteropodus Eigenmann & Beeson, 1893 
 S. carnatus
 S. caurinus
 S. chrysomelas
 S. hubbsi
 S. longispinis
 S. maliger
 S. nebulosus
 S. nivosus
 S. rastrelliger
 S. trivittatus
 Rosicola Jordan & Evermann, 1896
 S. babcocki
 S. miniatus
 S. pinniger
 Sebastichthys Gill, 1862 
 S. nigrocinctus
 Sebastocarus Jordan & Evermann, 1927   
 S. serriceps
 Sebastodes Gill, 1861
 S. goodei
 S. itinus
 S. jordani
 S. paucispinis
 S. steindachneri
 Sebastomus Gill, 1864   
 S. capensis
 S. chlorostictus 
 S. constellatus 
 S. ensifer
 S. eos
 S. exsul
 S. helvomaculatus
 S. lentiginosus 
 S. notius
 S. oculatus
 S. rosaceus 
 S. rosenblatti  
 S. serranoides
 S. simulator
 S. spinorbis
 S. umbrosus
 Sebastopyr Jordan & Evermann, 1927 
 S. ruberrimus
 Sebastosomus Gill, 1864   
 S. ciliatus
 S. diaconus
 S. flavidus
 S. melanops
 S. mystinus
 S. variabilis
 Takenokius Matsubara, 1943  
 S. oblongus 
 Zalopyr Jordan & Evermann, 1898   
 S. aleutianus
 S. borealis
 S. matsubarae
 S. melanostictus 
 Incertae sedis
 S. gilli
 S. koreanus
 S. moseri
 S. phillipsi
 S. polyspinis
 S. reedi

The genus name is derived from the Greek Sebastos, an honorific used in ancient Greek for the Roman imperial title of Augustus, an allusion to the old name for S. norvegicus on Ibiza, its type locality, which Cuvier translated as “august” or “venerable”.

The fossil record of rockfish goes back to the Miocene, with unequivocal whole body fossils and otoliths from California and Japan (although fossil otoliths from Belgium, "Sebastes" weileri, may push the record back as far as the early Oligocene).

Species
Sebastes contains 109 recognized extant species in this genus are:

Characteristics
Sebastes species have bodies which vary from elongate to deep, and which may be moderately to highly compressed with a comparatively large head. Their eyes vary from large to small. They may have spines on the head or these may be absent, if spines are present these can be small and weak to robust and there can be up to 8 of them. They lack a spiny horizontal ridge below the eye. The jaws have many small conical teeth and there are teeth on the roof of the mouth. The single dorsal fin is typically strongly incised at the posterior of the spiny portion which contains 12-15 robust, venom-bearing spines and to the rear of these are 9-16 soft rays, The anal fin has 2-4 spines and 6 to 11 soft rays. There is a spine in each of the pelvic fins as well as 5 soft rays and these are placed under the pectoral fins. The pectoral fins are large and may be rounded or pointed in shape with 14-22 soft rays, the longest being the central rays. The caudal fin is straight to slightly concave. The lateral line may have pored or tubed scales.

Distribution
Sebastes rockfish are found in the temperate North and South Pacific and Atlantic Oceans.

Biology
Sebastes rockfish may be long-lived, amongst the longest-living fish on earth, with several species known to surpass 100 years of age, and a maximum reported age of 205 years for S. aleutianus.

Ecotoxicology, radioecology
Like all carnivores, these fish can bioaccumulate some pollutants or radionuclides such as cesium. Highly radioactive rockfish have been caught in a port near Fukushima city, Japan, not far from the Fukushima Daiichi Nuclear Power Plant, nearly 2 years after the nuclear disaster (ex: 107000 Bq/kg (2013-02-12); 116000 Bq/kg (2013-02-13) and 132000Bq/kg (2013-02-13), respectively 1070, 1160, and 1320 times more than the maximum allowed by Japanese authorities (as updated on April 1, 2012)

Fisheries
Sebastes rockfish are important sport and commercial fish, and many species have been overfished. As a result, seasons are tightly controlled in many areas. Sebastes species are sometimes fraudulently substituted for the more expensive northern red snapper (Lutjanus campechanus).

References

 
Sebastini
Ray-finned fish genera
Sport fish
Negligibly senescent organisms
Extant Rupelian first appearances
Taxa named by Georges Cuvier
Rupelian genus first appearances